Diaphanophora is a genus of moths in the family Erebidae. It was erected by Christian Gibeaux and Francis Coenen in 2014.

Species
Diaphanophora albiscripta (Schaus, 1905)
Diaphanophora kindlii Gibeaux & Coenen, 2014

References

Phaegopterina
Moth genera